Peter Ludwig Mejdell Sylow (12 December 1832 – 7 September 1918) was a Norwegian mathematician who proved foundational results in group theory.

Biography
He was born and died in Christiania (now Oslo). Sylow was a son of government minister Thomas Edvard von Westen Sylow, and a brother of military officer and sports official Carl Sylow. He attended Christiania Cathedral School (1850) and the University of Christiania (cand.real.  1856).

Sylow was a high school teacher at Hartvig Nissen School, later before becoming a headmaster in Halden from 1858 to 1898. He was a substitute lecturer at University of Christiania in 1862, covering Galois theory. It was then that he posed the question that led to his theorems regarding Sylow subgroups. Sylow published the Sylow theorems in 1872, and subsequently devoted eight years of his life, with Sophus Lie, to the project of editing the mathematical works of his countryman, Niels Henrik Abel. In 1898, he was appointed professor at the University of Christiania.

In 1853, he was awarded the Crown Prince's gold medal (Kronprinsens gullmedalje) by the University of Oslo. In 1868 he was elected into the Norwegian Academy of Science and Letters. In 1894 he was awarded an honorary doctorate from the University of Copenhagen and became an editor for Acta Mathematica.

References

External links

1832 births
1918 deaths
People educated at Oslo Cathedral School
People from Halden
University of Oslo alumni
Academic staff of the University of Oslo
19th-century Norwegian mathematicians
20th-century Norwegian mathematicians
Group theorists
Recipients of the Pour le Mérite (civil class)